Rickettsia sibirica is a species of Rickettsia. This bacterium is the etiologic agent of North Asian tick typhus, which is also known as Siberian tick typhus. The ticks that transmit it are primarily various species of Dermacentor and Haemaphysalis.

References 

Rickettsiaceae